Jokin Gabilondo Garmendia (born 14 February 2000) is a Spanish professional footballer who plays as a right back for Real Sociedad C.

Club career
Born in Urretxu, Gipuzkoa, Basque Country, Gabilondo was a Real Sociedad youth graduate. He made his senior debut with the C-team on 25 August 2018, starting in a 2–0 Tercera División away win over SD San Pedro.

Gabilondo scored his first senior goal on 28 April 2019, netting the C's first in a 2–2 home draw against CD Basconia. He first appeared with the reserves on 9 November, starting in a 3–1 home success over Salamanca CF UDS in the Segunda División B.

On 6 October 2020, Gabilondo moved to fellow third division side Arenas Club de Getxo on loan for one year. Upon returning the following June, he was assigned back at the C-side.

Gabilondo made his professional debut with the B-team on 24 September 2021, replacing Roberto López late into a 0–2 Segunda División home loss against SD Huesca.

References

External links

1999 births
Living people
Sportspeople from Gipuzkoa
Spanish footballers
Footballers from the Basque Country (autonomous community)
Association football defenders
Segunda División players
Segunda División B players
Segunda Federación players
Tercera División players
Real Sociedad C footballers
Real Sociedad B footballers
Arenas Club de Getxo footballers
People from Goierri